This is a list of Top water companies in Saudi Arabia.

Top Brand of Saudi Arabia.

 1st. View Water

 2nd. Nova
3rd. Watany water (مصنع مياه وطني)
 Hada
 Nestle 
 berain
 Al-Qassim
 Hana
 Dome
 Tania
 Najed
 Al Ain (Delta Agthia Manufacturing Company)

 Al-Oyoun
 Dala
 Hayat
 Manahel
 Fayha
 Safa
 Mazen
 Al Manhel
 Amjad
 Nesscafe

References

Water companies